Ahn Byeong-ho (born 7 January 1991), better known by his stage name Ahn Woo-yeon, is a South Korean actor. He starred in TV series such as Five Enough (2016), Don't Dare to Dream (2016) and Strong Woman Do Bong-soon (2017).

Filmography

Television series

Web shows

Awards and nominations

References

External links
 An Woo-yeon at JS Pictures

21st-century South Korean male actors
South Korean male television actors
South Korean male film actors
Living people
1991 births
Seoul Institute of the Arts alumni